Ömerli is a town and the seat of Ömerli District in Mardin Province in southeastern Turkey. It is located in the historical region of Tur Abdin.

In the town, there was a church of Saint George. The church of Saint George was later converted into a mosque.

The town had a population of 6,698 in 2021.

Etymology
The Syriac name of the town is derived from "ma'ṣartā" ("wine-press" in Syriac). Maʿsarteh is identified as the town of Madaranzu in Bit-Zamani, which was conquered by Ashurnasirpal II, King of Assyria, in 879 BC. It is later mentioned by Theophylact Simocatta and George of Cyprus as Matzaron. In 1960, Maʿsarteh was officially renamed Ömerli.

History
The town was likely captured by a Sasanian army in 573 at the time of the siege of Dara, during the Roman-Sasanian War of 572-591, but was retaken and the fort was restored by the Roman commanders Theodore and Andrew in 587.

Maʿsarteh was part of the Syriac Orthodox diocese of the Monastery of Saint Abai until the death of its last bishop Isḥoq Ṣaliba in 1730, upon which the diocese was subsumed into the diocese of Mardin. German orientalist Eduard Sachau visited the town in 1880. Until the Assyrian genocide, the town was exclusively populated by Assyrians of the Syriac Orthodox Church. Survivors of the genocide fled to the Monastery of Saint Ananias.

After the Assyrian genocide, Assyrians from Maʿsarteh emigrated to Bethlehem and Jerusalem.  By 1989, all Assyrian families had fled the town, however, some later returned and, as of 2013, three Assyrian families inhabit the town.

Presently, the town mostly consist of Kurds and Mhallami. Of the two groups, the first ones to settle in the town were the Mhallamis who came from villages between Ömerli and Midyat such as Şenköy and Çavuşlu, while Kurds from the Bilikan tribe supposedly settled in the town due to blood feud. The Bilikan Kurds would become Arabophone over time and came to dominate local politics because of the size of their large families. They are plausibly the largest group in the town.

Other groups in the town include Kurds from other tribes, Arabs, few Assyrians and Georgians, and civil servants of Turkish roots.

According to the leaders of the Kurdish Omerkan (or Omeryan) tribe, who lives in the vicinity of the town, Ömerli had been under their rule for many years and considered the town to be in their territory. However, the town is not affiliated with any Kurdish tribe.

Politics 
In 1925, the town became the seat of a bucak (subdistrict) of Savur, and was elevated to district in 1953. In January 2017 the towns mayor Süleyman Tekin was arrested. In the local elections of 2019, Hüsamettin Altındağ from the Justice and Development Party was elected mayor.

Notable people
Ḥanna Salmān (1914-1981), Assyrian author

References
Notes

Citations

Biography

Tur Abdin
Assyrian communities in Turkey
Populated places in Mardin Province
Mhallami
Roman towns and cities in Turkey
Populated places in ancient Upper Mesopotamia

Kurdish settlements in Mardin Province